Heinrich Maria Waderé (2 July 1865 – 27 February 1950) was a German sculptor and medal engraver.

Waderé was born in Colmar. After an apprenticeship in an engraving workshop he studied at the Akademie der Bildenden Künste in Munich under Syrius Eberle. In 1900 he was appointed professor of figure sculpture at the Akademie für Angewandte Kunst in Munich. Once there he exhibited many times, including in the Münchner Glaspalast. From this period also originated his close connection to the school of carving at Oberammergau.

He was principally known for his Neoclassical medals and monuments, including among others the Richard Wagner Monument at the Prinzregentenplatz in Munich (1913). The figures above the portico of the Prinzregententheater are also by him.

He died in Munich.

Gallery

References

External links 

 Biographie 

German engravers
German medallists
Artists from Munich
1865 births
1950 deaths
20th-century German sculptors
20th-century German male artists
19th-century German sculptors
German male sculptors
20th-century German printmakers
20th-century engravers